Danis Mansurovich Latypov (born 28 September 1990) is a Russian-born Bahraini boxer. He competed in the 2020 Summer Olympics. Latypov is from Tatar descent.

References

External links
 

1990 births
Living people
People from Ishimbay
Sportspeople from Bashkortostan
Russian emigrants to Bahrain
Naturalized citizens of Bahrain
Russian male boxers
Bahraini male boxers
Boxers at the 2020 Summer Olympics
Olympic boxers of Bahrain
Tatar sportspeople